Yury Rudov (17 January 1931 – 26 March 2013) was a Soviet fencer. He won a gold medal in the team foil event at the 1960 Summer Olympics.

References

1931 births
2013 deaths
Russian male fencers
Soviet male fencers
Olympic fencers of the Soviet Union
Fencers at the 1956 Summer Olympics
Fencers at the 1960 Summer Olympics
Olympic gold medalists for the Soviet Union
Olympic medalists in fencing
Sportspeople from Taganrog
Medalists at the 1960 Summer Olympics